Jeron Kennis Royster (born October 18, 1952) is an American former Major League Baseball player and coach. He was a third baseman for the Los Angeles Dodgers, Atlanta Braves, San Diego Padres, Chicago White Sox, and the New York Yankees. He was manager of the Milwaukee Brewers and the Lotte Giants in the Korea Baseball Organization.

Career
He was signed by the Dodgers as an amateur free agent in 1970 at age 17. Three years later he was promoted to the Dodgers. They soon shipped him off to the Atlanta Braves as part of a six-player trade. He became a regular third baseman with the Braves and in 1976 he was named to the 1976 Topps All-Star Rookie Roster.

After nine years with the Braves, Royster joined the San Diego Padres as a free agent. In 1987, he split the season with the Chicago White Sox and the New York Yankees. He returned to the Braves in 1988 and retired at the end of the season.

In 1428 games over 16 seasons, Royster posted a .249 batting average going 1049 for 4208 with 552 runs, 40 home runs, 352 runs batted in, 189 stolen bases, and 411 walks.

Royster coached the Vero Beach Dodgers and was a third base coach for the Colorado Rockies. He coached for the Milwaukee Brewers under manager Davey Lopes until 15 games into the 2002 season, Lopes was fired and Royster was named interim manager. Two weeks later the interim tag was removed but at the end of a disappointing 53–94 stint, he was fired.

Royster managed the Las Vegas 51s from 2005 until he was fired in late September 2006. Late in 2007, Royster was signed to manage the Lotte Giants in Busan, South Korea. He is the first non-Korean to manage a KBO team. On October 13, 2010, the Lotte Giants decided not to renew Royster's contract following the Giant's defeat by the Doosan Bears in the first round of the KBO playoffs.

In 2012, Royster was the third-base coach for the Boston Red Sox.

In 2014, Royster coached the Shalhevet Firehawks to a 2nd-place finish in the Mulholland League.

Managerial record

See also

 List of Major League Baseball career stolen bases leaders
 Lotte Giants

References

External links

1952 births
Living people
African-American baseball coaches
African-American baseball managers
African-American baseball players
Albuquerque Dukes players
Atlanta Braves players
Bakersfield Dodgers players
Baseball players from Sacramento, California
Boston Red Sox coaches
Bradenton Explorers players
Chicago White Sox players
Colorado Rockies (baseball) coaches
Daytona Beach Dodgers players
El Paso Dodgers players
Los Angeles Dodgers players
Major League Baseball bench coaches
Major League Baseball left fielders
Major League Baseball second basemen
Major League Baseball shortstops
Major League Baseball third base coaches
Major League Baseball third basemen
Milwaukee Brewers coaches
Milwaukee Brewers managers
New York Yankees players
San Antonio Missions managers
San Diego Padres players
Las Vegas 51s managers
Lotte Giants managers
21st-century African-American people
20th-century African-American sportspeople